Elaine Gannon (born February 2, 1953) is an American politician. She is a member of the Missouri Senate, representing District 3. She is also a former member of the Missouri House of Representatives, having served from 2013 to 2021. She is a member of the Republican Party.

Missouri State Senate 
Elected in 2020, she preceded fellow Republican Gary Romine, after serving eight years in the Missouri House of Representatives.

Committee assignments 

 Education
 General Laws
 Progress and Development
 Seniors, Families, Veterans and Military Affairs, Vice-Chairwoman
 Joint Committee on Education
 Joint Committee on Child Abuse and Neglect
 Joint Committee on Legislative Research
 Missouri Assistive Technology Advisory Council

Views and response
Gannon sponsored a measure for Senate consideration in December 2022, which was aimed at extending Medicaid health insurance coverage for low-income mothers, from the current sixty days to twelve months following the birth of a baby. Bipartisan efforts to increase postnatal coverage for low-income families have been ongoing, with two bills failing earlier in 2022. 

In another bipartisan position, Gannon spoke against the actions of a group of Republican senators. The men, calling themselves the "Conservative Caucus", were blocking debate and delaying procedures to adopt a new congressional map. The redistricting was a bipartisan proposal which had already passed the house, but the Conservative Caucus faction obstructed action on it for several days. Speaking as part of a group of bipartisan women senators who were critical of the hardliner's intransigence and dominance of the debate, Gannon noted: "I think it's time that we the women of the Senate say what we want to say".

During a March, 2022, Senate Education committee hearing, Gannon attracted negative attention when she asked a 14-year-old witness, who identified as transgender and non-binary: "Are you going to go through the procedure?". The enquiry caused "an eruption of shouts", according to the St. Louis Post-Dispatch and "audible groans", according to Vice News. She was also criticized for her approach throughout the hearing, where she used expressions such as "he-she" in referring to transgender persons. The Senator later apologized for the inappropriate question. The teenage witness and the parent of the 14-year-old were critical of both Gannon and the hearing, which had been called to hear views on the proposed "Save Women's Sports Act". The bill would restrict children's access to sporting activity, disallowing participation in competitions by individuals whose assigned-sex at birth differs from the sex designated for the sporting activity.

Personal life 
She was born in Bonne Terre, and lives in De Soto, Missouri, with her husband, Dennis.

Electoral history

State Representative

State Senate

References

External links

1953 births
Living people
People from Bonne Terre, Missouri
Women state legislators in Missouri
Republican Party members of the Missouri House of Representatives
Republican Party Missouri state senators
21st-century American politicians
21st-century American women politicians
People from De Soto, Missouri